Leslie Oliver Lawrence (born 18 May 1957) is an English former footballer who played as a forward. He scored 105 goals in 395 league and cup games during a twelve-year career in the Football League, most of which was spent in the Fourth Division.

He began his career at Stourbridge before joining Shrewsbury Town in 1970. Two years later he joined Torquay United via Telford United. After 54 goals in 215 league and cup games for Torquay, he signed with Port Vale in July 1982. He played eight games of their promotion winning campaign, before transferring to Aldershot in July 1983. Leaving the "Shots" in 1984, he then spent a season each at Fourth Division sides Rochdale, Burnley, Peterborough United, and Cambridge United, before moving into non-league football with Kettering Town and Aylesbury United.

Career
Lawrence played for Southern League side Stourbridge, before joining Shrewsbury Town of the Third Division. He played 19 league games in 1975–76 and 1976–77, as the "Shrews" lifted the Welsh Cup in 1977 under Alan Durban's stewardship.

He then signed with Mike Green's Fourth Division club Torquay United via non-league Telford United for the 1977–78 campaign. He became the club's top scorer during the 1978–79 season with 19 goals. After finishing ninth in 1979–80, Torquay dropped to 17th in 1980–81. He played 215 games in all competitions, scoring 54 goals.

Lawrence joined John McGrath's Port Vale in July 1982. He made his debut as a substitute in a League Cup round one match against Rochdale on 30 August 1982. He made his full debut in a 2–0 home win over Hereford United on 9 October 1982, but failed to establish himself in the first team, and made just eight appearances in the 1982–83 Fourth Division promotion winning campaign.

He went on a free transfer in July 1983 and moved on to Aldershot. With 22 goals in 39 league games he helped Len Walker's "Shots" to a fifth-place finish in the Fourth Division in 1983–84, though they were seven points short of Bristol City in the promotion zone. He spent 1984–85 with Vic Halom's Rochdale, scoring four times in 15 league games. He then moved on to Burnley under Martin Buchan and Tommy Cavanagh, playing 31 league games in 1985–86, scoring eight goals. Lawrence then signed with Peterborough United, and scored eight goals in 33 league games in 1986–87 under John Wile and Noel Cantwell. In January 1988, he moved to his seventh different Fourth Division club, after putting pen to paper with Chris Turner's Cambridge United. After 13 goalless league games in 1987–88 he departed the Abbey Stadium for Conference outfit Kettering Town. He later played for Aylesbury United before retiring.

Career statistics
Source:

Honours
Shrewsbury Town
Welsh Cup: 1977

Port Vale
Football League Fourth Division third-place promotion: 1982–83

References

1957 births
Living people
Footballers from Wolverhampton
Black British sportsmen
English footballers
Association football forwards
Stourbridge F.C. players
Shrewsbury Town F.C. players
Telford United F.C. players
Torquay United F.C. players
Port Vale F.C. players
Aldershot F.C. players
Rochdale A.F.C. players
Burnley F.C. players
Peterborough United F.C. players
Cambridge United F.C. players
Kettering Town F.C. players
Aylesbury United F.C. players
English Football League players
National League (English football) players
Southern Football League players
Isthmian League players